James Munro (born 20 January 1997 in Christchurch, New Zealand) is a New Zealand former racing driver. Munro won championships in junior formulae such as Formula Ford and Formula Pilota China. James is the son of Mark Munro, a former Toyota Racing Series racing driver.

Racing career
After his New Zealand kart career Munro started racing cars in 2013. Racing a Mygale Munro won the New Zealand Formula Ford Championship winning ten out of fifteen races. He graduated into the fastest racing series in New Zealand, the Toyota Racing Series. Munro won one race at Timaru. The young driver finished seventh in the series championship. He was the second best scoring Kiwi, behind Damon Leitch who placed third. In the regular season Munro competed in the Formula Pilota China series. The series, using Tatuus FA010 Formula Abarth chassis with Volkswagen engines, ran on Asian circuits in China, South-Korea and Malaysia. Munro won the championship with Cebu Pacific Air by KCMG, a team headed by former racing driver John O'Hara. The Kiwi driver started the season with six straight race wins at Zhuhai and Shanghai. Munro won two more races at both circuits later in the season claiming the championship.

For 2015 Munro started the season again in the Toyota Racing Series. The series introduced a new car, the Tatuus FT50, with a new chassis and updated aerodynamics. Munro was less successful with only one podium finish, a second place at Teretonga Park. In the strong international field Munro placed ninth in the championship standings, again the second Kiwi behind Damon Leitch. During the regular summer season Munro started in the inaugural F4 Japanese Championship with KCMG. Initially announced competing the full season, Munro left the series after two rounds. Munro also competed in the Sepang 12 Hours along with Martin Rump, Afiq Yazid and Yuan Bo in a Lamborghini Huracán Super Trofeo. The team finished eleventh overall, winning the Pro-Am class. At the end of the season Munro rejoined KCMG to race the season opener of the 2015–16 Asian Le Mans Series. At Fuji Speedway Munro was joined by Christian Ried and team principal Paul Ip. in the GT Am class finishing eighth overall, fifth in class.

His third season in the Toyota Racing Series was the most successful. Munro scored three podium finishes and finished seventh in the season standings. The New Zealander signed with Team Pelfrey to compete in the American USF2000 series. During pre-season testing at Barber Motorsports Park finished second in the fifth test session. After two unsuccessful events at St. Petersburg and Barber Motorsports Park, Munro left the series.

Personal
Munro is a graduate from Medbury primary school. Munro has studied at Christ's College, Christchurch.

Racing record

Career Summary

USF2000 National Championship

References

1997 births
Living people
Sportspeople from Christchurch
People educated at Christ's College, Christchurch
People educated at Medbury School
New Zealand racing drivers
Formula Ford drivers
Toyota Racing Series drivers
U.S. F2000 National Championship drivers
Formula Masters China drivers
Asian Le Mans Series drivers
KCMG drivers
Team Pelfrey drivers
Japanese F4 Championship drivers